Caledonian Lane is a street in Melbourne.  It is a short, quiet and narrow (4 metre wide) open laneway, running between Little Bourke Street and Lonsdale Street in the central business district of Melbourne.

Caledonian Lane is most notable as the former home to the St Jerome's Laneway Festival.  It is also notable due to controversial developments in 2009 involving the redevelopment of the Post Office precinct and Department Store precinct also involving the shutting down of both St Jerome's and the festival.

A consortium involving Myer and Colonial First State applied for exemption from the City of Melbourne Heritage Overlay to widen the lane by 4 metres to improve access for delivery trucks and in the process demolish the Art Deco Lonsdale House in 2009. Permission was granted by both the City of Melbourne and the State planning minister Justin Madden MP on 24 July 2009 under controversial circumstances. In response to the demolition for the sake of lane widening, a preservation group called Save Lonsdale House formed in late 2009.

Until 2004, Caledonian Lane was home to a number of small independent store owners, however the buildings were sold under vacant possession in 2007.

The lane is bitumen with a small strip blue stone cobbled gutter, has street lighting attached to Lonsdale House and is by both pedestrian and vehicular traffic, mainly delivery trucks.  Caledonian Lane forms a vista toward both Loudon Place to the south and Drewery Lane to the north, both are almost directly opposite.

References 

Streets in Melbourne City Centre